"Rock with You" is a song by American singer Michael Jackson, written by Rod Temperton and produced by Quincy Jones. It was first offered to Karen Carpenter, while she was working on her first solo album, but she turned it down. It was released on November 3, 1979, by Epic Records as the second single from Jackson's fifth solo  studio album Off the Wall (1979). It was also the third number-one hit of the 1980s, a decade in which the pop singles chart would quickly be dominated by Jackson.

It reached number one on both the US pop (Jackson's third number-one on this chart) and R&B charts (Jackson's second number one on that chart). It spent a total of four weeks at the top position on the former chart from January 19 to February 9, 1980, and six weeks (from January 5 to February 9, 1980) on the latter chart. According to Billboard, the song was the fourth biggest single of 1980. It is also considered one of the last hits of the disco era.

It was re-released as a single on February 27, 2006, as part of the Visionary: The Video Singles box set. In 2021, Rolling Stone placed it at number 354 on its list of The 500 Greatest Songs of All Time·

Composition
"Rock with You" is  a Disco and funk song, that was written in the key of E minor. Meter is 4/4 at 114 bpm. Jackson's vocal range is F3 to G5.

Critical reception
The track received generally positive reviews from music critics. J. Edward Keyes of Rolling Stone said "What's remarkable about 'Rock With You' is how unobtrusive it is: a silky string section and barely-there twitch of guitar — Michael doesn't even hit the word 'Rock' all that hard — he just glides over it, preferring to charm with a wink and a smile rather than with aggression or ferocity." Steven Hyden called it his "favorite song", and noted the line "Girrrrrrl, when you dance, there's a magic that must be love" as being "the most purely joyful moment [Hyden] has ever heard in a pop song".
AllMusic highlighted the song on the album itself. Robert Christgau called it a "smooth ballad".  Cash Box praised the production, calling the song a "soft, classy number" with "multi-tracked harmonies," "a modified dance beat," "shimmering flute tones and jazzy guitar work."

Music video
A music video was released for the song, using the shorter single version. It features Michael in a sparkly sequined suit singing the song with a bright laser behind him. The video was directed by Bruce Gowers and filmed in 1979 at the 800 Stage in Los Angeles, California.

The music video was included on the video albums: Video Greatest Hits - HIStory, Number Ones and Michael Jackson's Vision.

Live performances
Michael Jackson first performed the song on the Jacksons' Destiny World Tour on the second leg. He performed the song on the Jacksons' Triumph Tour and Victory Tour. He performed the song on his solo tour the Bad World Tour. He also performed the song during the HIStory World Tour, as a part of the Off the Wall medley (also featuring "Off the Wall" and "Don't Stop Til' You Get Enough") in certain concerts. "Rock with You" was rehearsed for the Dangerous World Tour, but was not performed. Jackson also would have performed it for the This Is It concert series, but the shows were canceled, due to his sudden death.

Mixes
 Original LP version – 3:39
 This "classic" version was only released on initial runs of the LP record and cassette, as well as certain CD pressings manufactured in Japan, up to and including a Japanese-market version released in 1991. It was replaced by the full version of the 7" remix on later LP pressings and all other CD editions. The original version was later remastered and released on the "French Fans' Selection" deluxe box set edition of King of Pop.
 7" remix video edit – 3:23
 The "remix" was used for the single and to underscore the video. The remix re-pans the guitar, and adds more strings, horns, and hand claps in the chorus. An edit was made to the middle musical bridge by adding fingersnaps and shortening it from two parts to just one.
 7" version – 3:39
 This is the same as the 7" remix, but with the musical bridge left intact. This version appears on later pressings of the album.
 Extended version – 4:57
 Available only on the Japanese 12" promo, "Rock with You / Robin Hood". The latter song was recorded by Fox and the Promes.
 Masters at Work Remix – 5:29
 Frankie's Favorite Club Mix – 7:49
 Frankie Knuckles Radio Mix – 3:50
 The Masters at Work Remix and Frankie Knuckles remixes all contain previously unheard vocals and ad-libs not heard on the original album version. This is because the remixers were given access to the master tapes of the song to produce their remix. The master tapes contained additional vocals and cuts that didn't make it onto the original album version.
 Live 1981 (3:55)
 The live version, taken from the 1981 album The Jacksons Live!, was included on the UK 12" "Wanna Be Startin' Somethin'" single in 1983.
 Live 1988 (4:05)
 The live version, included in the deluxe edition of Bad 25 and on the DVD Live at Wembley July 16, 1988, was recorded during one of the shows at Wembley Stadium during the Bad World Tour.

Track listing and formats

European 7" vinyl single (EPC 8206)
A. "Rock with You" – 3:38
B. "Get on the Floor" – 4:44

Netherlands 12" vinyl single (EPC 12.8206)
A. "Rock with You" – 3:20
B1. "You Can't Win" – 7:17
B2. "Get on the Floor" – 4:44

UK 12" vinyl single  (EPC 13 8206) 
A. "Rock with You" - 3:20
B1: "You Can't Win" - 7:17
B2: "Get on the Floor" - 4:44

US 7" vinyl single (9-50797)
A. "Rock with You" – 3:20
B. "Working Day and Night" – 4:55

Visionary DualDisc single (82876725132)
CD side
 "Rock with You" (single mix) – 3:23
 "Rock with You" (Masters at Work Remix) – 5:33

DVD side
 "Rock with You" (video) – 3:23

Personnel

 Written and composed by Rod Temperton
 Produced by Quincy Jones
 Recorded and Mixed by Bruce Swedien
 Michael Jackson – lead and backing vocals
 Bobby Watson – bass
 John Robinson – drums
 David Williams, Marlo Henderson – electric guitar
 Greg Phillinganes, Michael Boddicker – synthesizers
 David "Hawk" Wolinski – Fender Rhodes

 Horns arranged by Jerry Hey and performed by The Seawind Horns
Jerry Hey – trumpet and flugelhorn
Larry Williams – tenor, alto saxophones and flute
Kim Hutchcroft – baritone, tenor saxophones and flute
William Reichenbach – trombone
Gary Grant – trumpet
 Rhythm and vocal arrangements by Rod Temperton
 String arrangement by Ben Wright
 Concert master – Gerald Vinci

Charts

Weekly charts

Year-end charts

Certifications

See also
List of Billboard Hot 100 number-one singles of 1980
List of number-one R&B singles of 1980 (U.S.)
List of number-one singles of 2006 (Spain)

References

External links
 

1970s ballads
1979 singles
Disco songs
Funk songs
Michael Jackson songs
Songs written by Rod Temperton
Billboard Hot 100 number-one singles
Cashbox number-one singles
Music videos directed by Bruce Gowers
Song recordings produced by Quincy Jones
Epic Records singles
1979 songs
Number-one singles in Spain
Songs about dancing
Pop ballads